Common Ground (2002) is an Argentine and Spanish drama film co-written, co-produced and directed by Adolfo Aristarain. The film marks the seventh collaboration between Aristarain and actor Federico Luppi. It also stars Mercedes Sampietro and Arturo Puig.

Synopsis 
After being forced to retire, literature professor Fernando Robles (Federico Luppi) and his wife Liliana (Mercedes Sampietro) are forced to reevaluate their lives and make major changes in them. These include setting the record straight with their son, exiled in Madrid and starting out a new life. They decide to buy a small lavender farm in Córdoba from a widowed man, Zacarías, and with the aid of their lawyer friend Carlos (Arturo Puig), attempt to start out their new business.

Along the way, Fernando, an aspiring writer himself, jots down notes and ideas for a novel in a book, which he frequently narrates in voice-overs. But this attempt at a new life is cut short when Fernando suddenly contracts pneumonia one cold night on the mountains. He is hospitalized and dies over a week, with enough time to bid farewell to his family and tell his wife all he never said out loud.

Liliana rejects the help of the sympathetic Carlos and the offer from her son Pedro to come live with his family in Spain. She opts to carry on her late husband's attempt of a new life, and stays in the farm Fernando helped rebuild.

Cast
Federico Luppi ... Fernando Robles
Mercedes Sampietro ... Liliana Rovira
Arturo Puig ... Carlos Sulla
Carlos Santamaria ... Pedro Robles
Valentina Bassi ... Natacha
Claudio Rissi ... Demedio

Awards and Nomination

See also 
 List of Spanish films of 2002

External links 
 

2002 films
Argentine drama films
Spanish drama films
2002 drama films
2000s political films
2000s Spanish-language films
Films featuring a Best Actress Goya Award-winning performance
2000s Argentine films
2000s Spanish films